Ras El Ma is a community in at least two Northern African states:
Ras El Ma or Ras Kebdana, Morocco
Ras El Ma, Sid Bel Abbés, Algeria